Miss International 2016, the 56th Miss International pageant, was held on October 27, 2016 at the Tokyo Dome City Hall in Tokyo, Japan. Edymar Martínez from Venezuela crowned her successor Kylie Verzosa from the Philippines at the end of the event.

The pageant was hosted by Tetsuya Bessho on his third consecutive year as host. This is the first time in Miss International history that the finals night saw the return of the previous year's runners-up to crown their respective successors.

Background
On February 9, 2016, it was announced by Akemi Shimomura, president of the International Cultural Association, that the 2016 pageant would be held at Tokyo Dome City Hall, Tokyo, Japan for first consecutive year on Thursday, October 27, 2016.

Result

Placements

Order of announcements
(Vote?

Top 15

Continental Queens

Special awards

Contestants
69 contestants have been confirmed:

Notes

Debuts

Returns
Last competed in 1994:
 

Last competed in 2007:
 

Last competed in 2013:
 

Last competed in 2014:

Withdrawals
 - No pageant.
 - No pageant.
 - Did not Compete.
 - No pageant.
 - Tatiana Rolín has been selected as Miss Internacional Paraguay 2016 seven days before the pageant begins. She will not compete in this edition due to schedule time and visa requirement. She will be competing at the next edition of Miss International pageant.
 - No pageant.
 - Çagla Çukurova has been selected as Miss Turkey International 2016. Due to schedule time and visa requirement, she cannot compete at the Miss International 2016.
 - No pageant.

References

External links
 Official Miss International website

2016 beauty pageants
2016
Beauty pageants in Japan
2016 in Tokyo